Allan Andrew Colin Smart (born 8 July 1974) is a Scottish football manager and former player who most recently managed Southern Football League club Daventry Town, where he also briefly served as club chairman.

In a 16-year playing career, Smart appeared as a striker for Caledonian, Caledonian Thistle, Preston North End, Carlisle United, Northampton Town, Watford, Hibernian, Stoke City, Oldham Athletic, Dundee United, Crewe Alexandra, Milton Keynes Dons, Bury, Portadown, Burscough and Southport.

Career
Smart began his career with junior club Balbeggie and had spells with St Johnstone and Brechin City, but without appearing for either's first team. In 1993, he joined Highland League club Inverness Caledonian; the following year Smart made his Scottish League debut following the merger which created Inverness Caledonian Thistle with entry into the Scottish League Third Division, but was soon sold to Preston North End for a fee of £15000. Here he was sent out on loan to a number of clubs to gain experience and match practice. These clubs included Carlisle United and Northampton Town. In between these loan deals he also managed to make first team appearances for Preston. However, after just thirty-one appearances for the club he was signed permanently by Carlisle in 1996.

During his time at Carlisle he helped them to promotion to the English Second Division including key goals against Lincoln City in a 1–0 victory and in a 5–1 victory over Torquay United. In the following season he did enough to impress over two league fixtures against Watford that Hornets manager, Graham Taylor, would pay £100,000 for his signature in 1998.

When at Watford he helped them get promoted to the Premier League for the 1999–2000 season. He scored the second goal after coming on as a substitute in Watford's 2–0 victory against Bolton in the 1999 Football League First Division play-off Final. Watford struggled to get a foot hold in the division as they finished 20th with just 24 points. However Smart still managed to score goals, including the winner against Chelsea and the equaliser against Tottenham Hotspur. He stayed with the club until November 2001, after two loan moves to Hibernian (where he scored once against St Johnstone) and Stoke City respectively. In his second and final appearance for Stoke he was sent off after a clash with Oldham's Darren Sheridan on 21 November 2001. He then signed for Oldham Athletic for a fee of £225,000 on 30 November 2001 and would ironically line up alongside Sheridan for his Oldham debut against Cardiff on 1 December 2001, a matter of days after their initial altercation.

His time at Oldham was both frustrating and disappointing for Smart, as he managed just twenty-one appearances during his season-long stay at the club, before being released at the end of the season. Since leaving Oldham in 2002, he had spells at Dundee United, Crewe Alexandra, MK Dons and Bury (where he scored once against Leyton Orient) before signing for Portadown in the close season of 2006.

In July 2007, Smart joined Conference North side Burscough on a season-long loan. When the loan deal expired, Smart made the move permanent as his Portadown contract had also expired. After the departure of manager Liam Watson from Burscough, Smart became the assistant manager at the club, whilst also remaining on the playing staff. In September 2009, he took up a full-time job, as Head of Youth Development at Southport, while temporarily remaining as player and assistant manager part-time at Burscough.

In November 2014, Smart took on his first position as a manager after replacing Darran Foster at Southern League Division One Central side Daventry Town.

After the shock departure of chairman Iain Humphrey in June 2015, Smart relinquished his role as manager to become Daventry Town's new chairman.

Personal life
Smart is divorced with four children. He is the son of a retired policeman.

In December 2001, Smart was involved in an incident after Oldham Athletic's Christmas party which saw him grab the throat of a barman, headbutt a fan of the club and cause £3,049 of damage to some hotel doors. In March 2002 he was arrested for assaulting a police officer in a brawl outside a police station. He subsequently pled guilty to affray, damaging property and assault with intent to resist arrest and was ordered to pay a £2,350 in compensation and costs.

In March 2017, Smart pled guilty to a charge of wounding with intent to cause grievous bodily harm at Swindon Crown Court after he bit off the earlobe of a friend in April 2016. He was ordered to pay a fine of £1,500 and do 300 hours of community work.

Career statistics
Source:

A.  The "Other" column constitutes appearances and goals in the Football League Trophy and Football League play-offs.

Honours
with Carlisle United
Football League Trophy winner: 1997

References

External links
 

1974 births
Living people
Scottish footballers
Bury F.C. players
Milton Keynes Dons F.C. players
Crewe Alexandra F.C. players
Dundee United F.C. players
Oldham Athletic A.F.C. players
Stoke City F.C. players
Hibernian F.C. players
Watford F.C. players
Preston North End F.C. players
Northampton Town F.C. players
Carlisle United F.C. players
Inverness Caledonian Thistle F.C. players
Premier League players
Portadown F.C. players
English Football League players
Scottish Premier League players
Burscough F.C. players
Southport F.C. players
Footballers from Perth, Scotland
Association football forwards
Caledonian F.C. players
Highland Football League players